The Sary-Mogol Botanical Reserve is located in Alay District of Osh Region of Kyrgyzstan. It was established in 1975 with a purpose of conservation of endemic Pulsatílla kostyczewii. The botanical reserve is situated at 3 km from the village Sary-Mogol and occupies 60 hectares.

References

Botanical reserves in Kyrgyzstan
Protected areas established in 1975